"Great DJ" is the second single by English indie pop band the Ting Tings. Vocalist Katie White states that the song was written by "playing a D chord on the guitar for hours, because that's all I could play. And then I put my finger on the wrong string, and got what I discovered was an augmented chord. And that was the riff!" The single was originally released as a double A-side along with "That's Not My Name".

When "Great DJ" was re-released, it did not enter the UK Singles Chart until one week after the individual re-release of single "That's Not My Name" went to number one.

The cover sleeves for the single were recycled: Katie White and Jules De Martino gathered old 7-inch records from numerous car boot sales and charity shops in and around Manchester, turned the sleeves inside out and customised them to create new sleeves for this single.

iTunes free single
"Great DJ" was featured on iTunes' free single of the week in Canada where it received an average of 3½ stars.

Track listings
7-inch vinyl (2007, Switchflicker Records)
 "That's Not My Name" – 3:43
 "Great DJ" – 3:23

One-sided 7-inch vinyl (2008, Columbia)
 "Great DJ" – 3:23

CD 1 (2008, Columbia)
 "Great DJ" – 3:23
 "Great DJ" (Calvin Harris remix edit) – 6:37
 "Great DJ" (7th Heaven radio edit) – 3:31

CD 2 (2008, Columbia)
 "Great DJ" (Calvin Harris remix) – 7:05
 "Great DJ" (7th Heaven remix) – 6:38
 "Great DJ" (7th Heaven dub) – 6:53

Charts

Certifications and sales

Release history

References

2007 songs
2008 singles
2009 singles
Columbia Records singles
Songs written by Jules De Martino
Songs written by Katie White
The Ting Tings songs